Fencing competitions at the 2011 Pan American Games in Guadalajara will be held from October 24 to October 29 at the Multipurpose Gymnasium. All 12 events will be on the schedule, meaning every team event will be contested, after reverting to Olympic only events in 2007.

Medal summary

Medal table

Men's events

Women's events

Schedule
All times are Central Daylight Time (UTC-5).

Qualification

An NOC may enter up to 3 athletes per weapon (épée, foil, or sabre) if it has qualified for the team event and 1 athlete per if it has not.

The top seven teams at the 2010 Pan American Championship in San Jose, Costa Rica plus hosts Mexico in each team event qualify a three athletes for each respective team event, and two athletes for the individual event for that weapon. Also this championship qualified the top 2 athletes per event for the individual event if the country had not qualified through the team event.

Participating nations

References

 
Events at the 2011 Pan American Games
P
2011
International fencing competitions hosted by Mexico